Kamakau may refer to:

Kelou Kamakau, also known as Kamakaunui
Samuel Kamakau
Edward Kamakau Lilikalani
Kamakau (mountain), mountain on Molokai